Karel Hoplíček (15 December 1913 – 1964) was a Czech athlete. He competed in the men's shot put at the 1936 Summer Olympics.

References

External links

1913 births
1964 deaths
Athletes (track and field) at the 1936 Summer Olympics
Czech male shot putters
Olympic athletes of Czechoslovakia
Place of birth missing